Finnish orthography is based on the Latin script, and uses an alphabet derived from the Swedish alphabet, officially comprising twenty-nine letters but also including two additional letters found in some loanwords. The Finnish orthography strives to represent all morphemes phonologically and, roughly speaking, the sound value of each letter tends to correspond with its value in the International Phonetic Alphabet (IPA) – although some discrepancies do exist.

Alphabet

The following table describes how each letter in the Finnish alphabet is spelled and pronounced separately. If the name of a consonant begins with a vowel (usually  ), it can be pronounced and spelled either as a monosyllabic or bisyllabic word. In practice, the names of the letters are rarely spelled, as people usually just type the (uppercase or lowercase) glyph when they want to refer to a particular letter.

The pronunciation instructions enclosed in slashes are broad transcriptions based on the IPA system. In notes, more narrow transcriptions are enclosed in square brackets.

The extra letters Ä and Ö

"I seek" vs.  "he, she").

In handwritten text, the actual form of the extra marking may vary from a pair of dots to a pair of short vertical bars, to a single horizontal bar, or to a wavy line resembling a tilde. In practice, almost any diacritic situated above the base glyph (for example) would probably be interpreted as a carelessly written pair of dots. However, in computerized character sets, these alternatives are incorrect.

Non-native letters in the Finnish alphabet

In the Finnish writing system, some basic Latin letters are considered redundant, and other letters generally represent sounds that are not inherent in the Finnish language. Thus, they are not used in established Finnish words, but they may occur in newer loanwords as well as in foreign proper names, and they are included in the Finnish alphabet in order to maintain interlingual compatibility. The pronunciation of these letters varies quite a lot.

 The redundant letters are often replaced with more common alternatives in Finnish, except in proper names. In addition, the Swedish  is redundant from the Finnish point of view, as its pronunciation is more or less equivalent to the Finnish way of pronouncing . It is officially included in the Finnish alphabet so that keyboards etc. would be compatible with Swedish, which is one of the two official languages in Finland, as well as for the reproduction of Swedish proper names, which are quite common in Finland, even as surnames of monolingual speakers of Finnish.
 The letters representing foreign sounds can be found in relatively new loanwords, but in more established loanwords they have been replaced with alternatives that better reflect the typical Finnish pronunciation, e.g. 'coffee',  'beard'. From a historical point of view, even  could be said to belong to this group, but the  sound has long been an established part of standard language.
 The letters  and  could be classified into both of the aforementioned groups. The  sound is not regarded as a phoneme in Finnish, but historically  was used to mark  (or, rather), as in Dutch, German or Polish. Occasionally this can also be applied for faux-archaic effect, as in  "Ye Olde Harbour". Likewise, the z is not native to Finnish, but  (or ) was formerly used to denote  (as in German). It is still often pronounced , but its pronunciation varies greatly: some speakers may pronounce it , or sometimes . 
For example, Russian  (transcribed Brezhnev in English) is transliterated . However, these sounds are foreign to the Finnish language, the letters do not appear on Finnish keyboards and their pronunciation is not consistent. The  sound is familiar to most Finnish speakers and quite commonly used in many loanwords, e.g. 'chess', but  is restricted to foreign words only.

Collation order
In Finnish, words are ordered alphabetically according to the collation rules specified in the official standard SFS 4600. There are a few cases where Finnish collation is different from the rules applied in English:

 å, ä and ö are regarded as distinct letters and collated after z
 w is generally regarded as equivalent to v (in a multilingual context it may, however, be collated separately after v, as in English).

Diacritics are never added to letters in native Finnish words (as the dots above the Finnish graphemes ä and ö are not considered diacritics). Generally, diacritics are retained in foreign-language proper names, e.g. Vilén, if possible, but when arranging words alphabetically, diacritics are usually ignored (this also applies to š and ž, despite them being an officially recognized part of Finnish orthography). There are, however, some exceptions:

 German and Turkish ü and Hungarian ű are alphabetized as y, not as u
 Danish and Norwegian ø, Estonian õ and Hungarian ő are alphabetized as ö, not as o.

The standard does not specify how one should alphabetize the letter ü when used in other languages than German, but at least as regards the Estonian or Hungarian ü, it seems consistent to treat it as equivalent to y (and even more so, since ü in Estonian and Hungarian is not considered a mere variant of u, as it is in German). It would seem problematic, however, to apply the same principle to e.g. ü (u-diaeresis) as used in Spanish or õ (nasal vowel) as used in Portuguese, as these letters represent quite different orthographic traditions.

Other special cases:

 Sami ŋ (eng) is alphabetized as n
 Sami đ (d with stroke) and Icelandic ð (eth) are alphabetized as d
 Icelandic þ (thorn) is alphabetized as th
 Polish ł (l with stroke) is alphabetized as l.

Ligatures are alphabetized as two individual letters:

 æ is alphabetized as ae (not as ä)
 œ is alphabetized as oe (not as ö)
 ß is alphabetized as ss.

Letters and characters taken from other alphabets (e.g. Σ 'Greek capital letter sigma') or writing systems are collated after Latin letters.

Orthographic principles

When writing Finnish, the foundational principle is that each letter stands for one sound and each sound is always represented by the same letter, within the bounds of a single morpheme. The most notable exception to this rule is the velar nasal , which does not have an allotted letter.

Short and long sounds
In Finnish, both vowels and consonants may be either short or long. A short sound is written with a single letter, and a long sound is written with a double letter (digraph). It is necessary to recognize the difference between such words as   'fire',   'wind' and   'customs'.

In syllabification, a long consonant is always regarded as having a syllable break in the middle (as in ), but a long vowel (or a diphthong) is regarded as a single unit that functions as the nucleus of a syllable. Either a long or short vowel may occur in a stressed as well as unstressed syllable. The phonetic quality of a vowel remains the same regardless of whether the vowel is long or short, or whether it is stressed or unstressed.

Velar nasal
The velar nasal  (generally referred to as  'the eng sound') does not have a letter of its own. The geminated  is not an allophone of geminated , since minimal pairs do exist:   'textile' vs.   'isthmus'.

The treatment of the velar nasal in loanwords is highly inconsistent, often mixing the original spelling of the word with an applied Finnish pronunciation pattern. Following the typical Finnish pronunciation pattern,  "congestion" is often pronounced , but  may also occur.

Voiced plosives
However, these borrowings being relatively common, they are nowadays considered part of the educated norm. Even many educated speakers, however, still make no distinction between voiced and voiceless plosives in regular speech, although minimal pairs exist:  'bus' vs.  'bag',  'gorilla' vs.  'with/at a basket'.

At the time when Mikael Agricola, the "father" of literary Finnish, devised a system for writing the language, this sound still had the value of the voiced dental fricative , as in English "then".

For example historical and rare dialectal ,  "our" (gen.), "hand" (gen.) could be:

 , 
 , 
 , 
 (rare) , 

In the middle of the 19th century, a significant portion of the Swedish-speaking upper class in Finland decided that Finnish had to be made equal in usage to Swedish. They even started using Finnish as their home language, even while very few of them really mastered it well.

Initially, few native speakers of Finnish acquired the foreign plosive realisation of the native phoneme. Nowadays, the Finnish language spoken by native Swedish speakers is not anymore considered paradigmatic, but as a result of their long-lasting prestige, many people particularly in the capital district acquired the new  sound. Due to diffusion of the standard language through mass media and basic education, and due to the dialectal prestige of the capital area, the plosive  can now be heard in all parts of the country, at least in loanwords and in formal speech.

Väinö Linna uses  as a hallmark of unpleasant command language in the novel The Unknown Soldier. Lieutenant Lammio was a native Helsinkian, and his language was considered haughty upper-class speech. On the other hand, private Asumaniemi's (another native Helsinkian)  raised no irritation, as he spoke Helsinki slang as his everyday speech.

In Helsinki slang, the slang used by some, more rarely nowadays, in Helsinki, the voiced stops are found in native words even in positions which are not the result of consonant gradation, e.g. 's/he walked' (← native verb root ),  'to understand' (← Russian  понимать). They are also found in those coastal areas where Swedish influenced the speech.

The spelling alphabet

References

External links 
 Omniglot: writing systems and languages of the world: Finnish
 Letters in Finnish
 Finnish pronunciation (compared to English, IPA available)

Finnish language
Latin-script orthographies